The list of winners of the Nandi Award for Best Book on Telugu Cinema since 1995:

See also
Nandi Awards

References

Nandi Awards